Accomplished Quaker was a French vessel that the British captured circa 1801. She first appeared in Lloyd's Register (LR) in the volume for 1801.

Lloyd's List reported on 20 November 1804 that as she was sailing from Archangel to London she wrecked near Drontheim. Her crew was saved.

Citations

1800s ships
Captured ships
Age of Sail merchant ships of England
Maritime incidents in 1804